State Route 703 (SR 703) is the designation of the Maine Turnpike Authority Approach Road, a  road located in South Portland, Maine. It connects U.S. Route 1 (US 1) and State Route 9 to the Maine Turnpike (Interstate 95, I-95), as well as I-295 and The Maine Mall. Except at its endpoints, it is a four-lane freeway with a  speed limit.

The SR 703 designation is only indicated on mileposts, which increase from east to west as opposed to the standard practice of increasing from west to east. All other signage refers to the routes to which it connects (I-95, I-295, US 1 and SR 114).

Route description 
SR 703 begins at an at-grade intersection with Main Street (US 1/SR 9) just north of the Scarborough town line. Heading westbound, the highway meets the northbound Scarborough Connector at Exit N, which connects to I-295 north and Broadway. After crossing under I-295, Exit G connects directly to The Maine Mall and Maine Mall Rd. The highway terminates at a diamond interchange at the Maine Turnpike as of 5 October 2022, which used to be a trumpet interchange prior to the reconfiguration of Exit 45.

There are four lettered exits heading eastbound: Exit J serves The Maine Mall via Maine Mall Rd / Payne Rd, Exit E connects directly to I-295 north, Exit A connects to Broadway in South Portland, and Exit S connects with the southbound Scarborough Connector, which carries traffic towards US 1/SR 9 in downtown Scarborough.

History 
The Maine Turnpike Approach Road has existed in some form since the Maine Turnpike first opened to traffic in 1947. Various improvements and upgrades, including the construction of the southern section of I-295 in 1971, have resulted in the modern freeway that exists today. The SR 703 number was first introduced in official correspondence in 2004 and was later made an official (albeit unsigned) designation.

On 5 October 2022, Exit 45 on the Maine Turnpike was reconfigured from a trumpet interchange into a diamond interchange.

Extension 
The Maine Turnpike Authority has proposed constructing a toll road, called the Gorham Connector, to connect SR 703 to SR 114 where it intersects with the Gorham Bypass road, for the purpose of relieving chronic traffic congestion on SR 22 and SR 114. The six mile road would have an interchange at Route 22 and at Running Hill Road in Scarborough, with an estimated toll of $1.50.  It is estimated to cost as much as $237 million. The Maine Legislature has limited the bond capacity of the MTA for constructing such a road to $150 million, but other Turnpike revenues can go towards such a project.  The Portland City Council passed a resolution opposing construction of the road, citing climate change; the four communities abutting the route, Scarborough, South Portland, Westbrook, and Gorham, have all preliminarily approved it.

Exit list 
Exits are listed in order from east to west as mileposts increase in that direction.

References

External links

Transportation in Cumberland County, Maine
Freeways in the United States
703
South Portland, Maine